Maura Murray (born May 4, 1982) is an American woman who disappeared on the evening of February 9, 2004, after a car crash on Route 112 near Woodsville, New Hampshire, a village in the town of Haverhill. Her whereabouts remain unknown. She was a 21-year-old nursing student completing her junior year at the University of Massachusetts Amherst at the time of her disappearanceֹ.

Background

Early life

Maura Murray was born May 4, 1982, in Hanson, Massachusetts, the fourth child of Frederick "Fred" and Laurie Murray. She had an older brother, Fred; two older sisters, Kathleen and Julie; and a younger half-brother, Kurt. Maura was raised in an Irish Catholic household. When she was six, her parents divorced, after which Maura lived primarily with her mother.

Murray graduated from Whitman-Hanson Regional High School, where she was a star athlete on the school's track team. She was accepted into the United States Military Academy in West Point, New York, where she studied chemical engineering for three semesters. After her freshman year, she transferred to the University of Massachusetts Amherst to study nursing.

Prior to disappearance

In November 2003, three months before her disappearance, Murray admitted to using a stolen credit card to order food from several restaurants, including one in Hadley, Massachusetts. The charge was continued in December, to be dismissed after three months' good behavior.

On the evening of February 5, 2004, while she was on duty at her campus-security job, Murray spoke on the phone with her older sister, Kathleen. They discussed Kathleen's relationship problems with her fiancé. Around 10:30 p.m., while still on her shift, Murray reportedly broke down in tears. When her supervisor arrived at her desk, Murray was "just completely zoned out. No reaction at all. She was unresponsive." The supervisor escorted Murray back to her dorm room around 1:20 am. When asked what was wrong, Murray said two words: "My sister." The contents of this call remained unknown until October 2017, when Kathleen publicly explained the conversation: Kathleen, a recovering alcoholic, had been discharged from a rehabilitation clinic that evening, and on the way home, her fiancé took her to a liquor store, which caused an emotional breakdown.

On Saturday, February 7, Murray's father Fred arrived in Amherst. He told investigators he and Murray went car-shopping that afternoon, and later went to dinner with a friend of his daughter. Murray dropped her father off at his motel room and, borrowing his Toyota Corolla, returned to campus to attend a dorm party. She arrived at 10:30 pm. At 2:30 am on Sunday, February 8, she left the party. At 3:30 am, en route to her father's motel, she struck a guardrail on Route 9 in Hadley, causing nearly $10,000 worth of damage to her father's car. The responding officer wrote an accident report, but there is no documentation of field sobriety tests being conducted. Murray was driven to her father's motel and stayed in his room the rest of the morning. At 4:49 am, there was a cell phone call placed to her boyfriend from Fred's phone. The participants and content of the phone call are unknown.

Later Sunday morning, Fred Murray learned the damage to his vehicle would be covered by his auto insurance. He rented a car, dropped Murray off at the university, and departed for Connecticut. At 11:30 that night, Fred called his daughter to remind her to obtain accident forms from the Registry of Motor Vehicles. They agreed to talk again Monday night to discuss the forms and fill out the insurance claim via phone.

Monday, February 9, 2004

Preparations and departure

After midnight on Monday, February 9, Murray used her personal computer to search MapQuest for directions to the Berkshires and Burlington, Vermont. The first reported contact Murray had with anyone on February 9 was at 1:00 pm, when she emailed her boyfriend: "I love you more stud. I got your messages, but honestly, i didn't feel like talking too much of anyone, i promise to call today though. love you, Maura" She also made a phone call inquiring about renting a condominium at the same Bartlett, New Hampshire, condo association with which her family had vacationed in the past. Telephone records indicate the call lasted three minutes. The owner did not rent the condo to Murray. At 1:13 pm, Murray called a fellow nursing student for reasons unknown.

On the afternoon of Monday, February 9, at 1:24 pm, Murray emailed a work supervisor of the nursing school faculty that she would be out of town for a week due to a death in her family. According to her family, the family had not experienced a death. She also said she would contact them when she returned. At 2:05 pm, Murray called a number which provides recorded information about booking hotels in Stowe, Vermont. The call lasted approximately five minutes. At 2:18 pm, she telephoned her boyfriend and left a voice message promising him they would talk later. This call ended after one minute.

In her car, Murray packed clothing, toiletries, college textbooks, and birth control pills. When her room was searched later, campus police discovered most of her belongings packed in boxes and the art removed from the walls. It is not clear whether Murray packed them that day, but police at the time said she had packed between Sunday night and Monday morning. On top of the boxes was a printed email to Murray's boyfriend indicating trouble in their relationship. Around 3:30 pm, she drove off the campus in her black 1996 Saturn sedan; classes at the university had been canceled that day due to a snowstorm.

At 3:40 pm, Murray withdrew $280 from an ATM. Closed-circuit footage showed she was alone. At a nearby liquor store, Murray purchased about $40 worth of alcoholic beverages, including Baileys Irish Cream, Kahlúa, vodka, and a box of Franzia wine. Security footage again shows she was alone when she made that purchase. At some point in the day, she also picked up accident-report forms from the Massachusetts Registry of Motor Vehicles.

Murray then left Amherst between 4 and 5pm, presumably via Interstate 91 north. She called to check her voicemail at 4:37 pm, the last recorded use of her cell phone. To date there is no indication she had informed anyone of her destination, or any evidence that she had chosen one.

Disappearance

7:27 pm: Report of car accident

Some time after 7:00pm, a Woodsville, New Hampshire resident heard a loud thump outside her house. Through her window, she could see a car up against the snowbank along Route 112, also known as Wild Ammonoosuc Road. The car pointed west on the eastbound side of the road. At 7:27pm, the local woman reported the car accident on the sharp corner of Route 112 adjacent to her home. She telephoned the Grafton County Sheriff's Department at 7:27pm to report the accident. According to the 9-1-1 log, the woman claimed to have seen a man smoking a cigarette inside the car. However, she later stated that she had not seen a man nor a person smoking a cigarette, but rather had seen what appeared to be a red light glowing from inside the car, potentially from a cell phone. A passing motorist, a school bus driver who lived nearby, stopped at the scene. They saw the car, as well as a young woman walking around the vehicle.

The school bus driver noticed the young woman was not bleeding or visibly injured, but cold and shivering. He offered to call for help. She asked him not to call the police (one police report says "pleaded") and assured him she had already called AAA (AAA has no record of any such call). Knowing there was no cellular reception in the area, the bus driver continued home and called the police. His call was received by the Sheriff's Department at 7:43 pm. He was unable to see Murray's car while he made the call but did notice several cars pass on the road before the police arrived. Another local resident driving home from work claims she passed by the scene around 7:37 pm, and saw a police SUV parked face-to-face with Murray's car. She pulled over briefly and did not see anyone inside or outside the cars, and decided to continue home. This witness's statement contradicts the official police log, which has Haverhill police arriving nine minutes later.

7:46 pm: Police arrival at scene

 
According to the official police log, at 7:46 pm, a Haverhill police officer arrived at the scene, but the woman driver had disappeared. No one was inside or around the car. The car had impacted the tree on the driver's side of the vehicle, severely damaging the left headlight and pushing the car's radiator into the fan, rendering it inoperable. The car's windshield was cracked on the driver's side, and both airbags had deployed. The car was locked.

Inside and outside the car, he discovered red stains that looked to be red wine. Inside the car, the officer found an empty beer bottle and a damaged box of Franzia wine on the rear seat. In addition, he found a AAA card issued to Murray; blank accident-report forms; gloves, compact discs, makeup, diamond jewelry; driving directions to Burlington, Vermont; Murray's favorite stuffed animal, and Not Without Peril, a book about mountain climbing in the White Mountains. Missing were Murray's debit card, credit cards, and cell phone, none of which has been located or used since her disappearance. The police later reported some of the bottles of purchased liquor were also missing.

Journalist Joe McGee, writing for the Quincy, Massachusetts, Patriot Ledger, summarized the incident: "At a hairpin turn, she went off the road. Her car hit a tree. At that point, a person came along who was driving a bus. It was a neighbor. He asked her if she needed help. She refused. About 10 minutes later, police showed up to the scene and Maura Murray was gone."

Police traced the vehicle to Murray, and initially treated her as a missing person on the belief that she may have wanted to disappear voluntarily. This speculation was based on her travel preparations (about which she had confided nothing to friends or family) and no obvious evidence of foul play. In 2009, Murray's case was given to the New Hampshire cold case division, and authorities are handling it as a "suspicious" missing persons case.

8:00–9:30 pm: Alleged sighting

He noted that the young person was wearing jeans, a dark coat, and a light-colored hood. He did not report it to police immediately due to his own confusion of dates, only discovering three months later (when reviewing his work records) that he had spotted the young person the same night Murray disappeared.

The responding officer and the bus driver drove around the area searching for Murray. Just before 8:00 pm, EMS and a fire truck arrived to clear the scene. By 8:49 pm, the car had been towed to a local garage. At about 9:30 pm, the responding officer left. A rag believed to have been part of Murray's emergency roadside kit was discovered stuffed into the Saturn's muffler pipe. Authorities would refer to Murray as simply "missing" at 12 pm the next day, almost 24 hours after the last confirmed sighting of her.

Search efforts

Initial investigation (2004–2005)

February–June 2004

At 12:36 pm the following day, February 10, a "Be on the Lookout" report for Murray was issued. She was reported as wearing a dark coat, jeans, and a black backpack. A voicemail was left on Fred Murray's home answering machine at 3:20 pm stating that her car had been found abandoned. He was working out of state and did not receive this call. At 5:00 pm, Murray's older sister contacted her father to tell him of the situation. He then contacted the Haverhill Police Department and was told that, if Murray was not reported safe by the following morning, the New Hampshire Fish and Game Department would start a search. At 5:17 pm, Murray was first referred to as "missing" by the Haverhill police.

On February 11, Murray's father arrived before dawn in Haverhill. At 8:00 am, New Hampshire Fish and Game, the Murrays, and others began to search. A police dog tracked the scent from one of Murray's gloves 100 yards east from where the vehicle had been discovered, but lost the scent. This suggested to police she'd left the area in another car. At 5:00 pm, Murray's boyfriend and his parents arrived in Haverhill. He was interrogated in private, and then was joined by his parents for questioning. At 7:00 pm, the police said they believed Murray came to the area either to run away or attempt suicide; her family believed this was unlikely.

Murray's boyfriend had turned off his cell phone during his flight to Haverhill. At some point, he received a voicemail that he believed was the sound of Murray sobbing. The call was traced to a calling card issued to the American Red Cross.

On February 12, Murray's father and her boyfriend held an evening press conference in Bethlehem, New Hampshire, and the next day the first press coverage was published. At 3:05 pm, the police reported Murray might be headed to the Kancamagus Highway area, and she was "listed as endangered and possibly suicidal". The police report also stated Murray was intoxicated at the crash site, although the bus driver had said she did not appear impaired. The Haverhill police chief said that, "Our concern is that she's upset or suicidal."

A week after Murray's disappearance, her father and boyfriend were interviewed by CNN's American Morning. Murray's family expanded their search into Vermont, dismayed that authorities there had not been informed of her disappearance.

Although missing person cases are normally handled by local and state police, the FBI joined the investigation ten days after she disappeared. The FBI interviewed family from Massachusetts, and the Haverhill police chief announced that the search was now nationwide. Ten days after her disappearance, New Hampshire Fish and Game conducted a second ground and air search, using a helicopter with a thermal imaging camera, tracking dogs and cadaver dogs. Murray's older sister discovered a ripped white pair of women's underwear lying in the snow on a secluded trail near French Pond Road on February 26, but DNA tests found that the underwear did not belong to Murray.

At the end of February, the police returned the items found in Murray's car to her family. On March 2, the family checked out of their motel, exhausted from the search. Fred Murray returned nearly every weekend to continue searching. In April, Haverhill Police informed him of complaints of trespassing on private property. However, state police have stated there are no links between the two cases.

In April and again in June, New Hampshire and Vermont police dismissed any connection between Murray's case and Maitland's. In a press release, they stated they believed that "Maura was headed for an unknown destination and may have accepted a ride in order to continue to that location," adding that they had discovered no evidence that a crime had been committed. They dismissed the possibility of a serial killer being involved.

July 2004–December 2005

On July 1, police retrieved the items found in Murray's vehicle from her family for forensic analysis. On July 13, a one-mile radius search was performed by nearly 100 searchers, including state troopers, rescue personnel, and volunteers. It was the fourth search around the crash area and the first search performed without snow on the ground. Authorities were most interested in locating the black backpack Murray had in her possession but not found in her car. Police stated the search discovered "nothing conclusive".

In late 2004, a man allegedly gave Murray's father a rusty, stained knife that belonged to the man's brother, who had a criminal past and lived less than a mile from where the car was discovered. His brother and his brother's girlfriend were said to have acted strangely after the disappearance, and the man's brother claimed he believed the knife had been used to kill Murray. Several days after the knife was given to Murray's father, the man's brother allegedly scrapped his Volvo. Family members of the man who turned in the knife claimed he had made up the story in order to obtain reward money in the investigation, and that he had a history of drug use.

In 2005, Fred Murray petitioned New Hampshire Governor Craig Benson for help in the search, and appeared on The Montel Williams Show in November 2004 to publicize the case. On February 9, 2005, the first anniversary of Murray's disappearance, a service was held where the car was found, and her father met briefly with New Hampshire Governor John Lynch.

In late 2005, Fred Murray filed suit against several law enforcement agencies, with the aim of seeing files on the case. Murray had owned a black backpack. Senior Assistant Attorney General Jeffery Strelzin stated that law enforcement "was aware of the backpack," but did not disclose whether it had been taken for forensic testing.

Subsequent searches (2006–2010)

The New Hampshire League of Investigators, ten retired police officers and detectives, and the Molly Bish Foundation started working on the case in 2006. Tom Shamshak, a former police chief and a member of the Licensed Private Detectives Association of Massachusetts, said, "It appears...that this is something beyond a mere missing persons case. Something ominous could have happened here." The Arkansas group Let's Bring Them Home offered a $75,000 reward in 2007 for information that could solve her disappearance.

In October 2006, volunteers led a two-day search within a few miles of where Murray's car was found. The house had formerly been the residence of the man implicated by his brother, who had given Fred Murray the rusty knife in 2004. A sample of carpet from the home was sent to the New Hampshire State Police, but the results were never released to the public. In July 2008, volunteers led another two-day search through wooded areas in Haverhill. The group consisted of dog teams and licensed private investigators.

Murray's case was one of many cited by proponents of a statewide cold case unit for New Hampshire in 2009. Her case was subsequently added to the newly established cold case unit later that year. In 2010, Fred Murray publicly criticized the police investigation for treating the disappearance as a missing persons case and not a criminal matter, and called on the FBI to join the investigation. Jeffery Strelzin said in February 2009 that the investigation was still active: "We don't know if Maura is a victim, but the state is treating it as a potential homicide. It may be a missing-persons case, but it's being handled as a criminal investigation."

Further developments (2011–present)
In 2014, on the tenth anniversary of Murray's disappearance, Strelzin stated that "We haven't had any credible sightings of Maura since the night she disappeared." In an article published in the New York Daily News on the tenth anniversary of his daughter's disappearance, it was reported that Fred Murray believed she was dead and had been abducted the night of her disappearance.

On February 9, 2017, the thirteenth anniversary of Murray's disappearance, Strelzin wrote in an email to The Boston Globe: "It's still an open case with periods of activity and [at] times it goes dormant. There are no new updates to share at this time."

In February 2019, the fifteenth anniversary of Murray's disappearance, Fred Murray reiterated his belief that his daughter was dead, as well as his suspicions about the nearby house that cadaver dogs responded to, stating, "That's my daughter, I do believe." In early April, excavation was done within the basement of the house. Fred Murray had previously wanted to search the home, but the owners did not cooperate. Following sale of the property, its new owners allowed several searches of the property since February. The excavation conducted in early April found "absolutely nothing, other than what appears to be a piece of pottery or old piping."

In early 2021, the tree at the site where Murray was last seen—which had been marked with a blue ribbon as a memorial—was cut down by the property owner. Shortly thereafter, a request from Murray's family to have a New Hampshire historical marker placed at the site, which had been submitted in late 2020, was turned down by the New Hampshire Division of Historical Resources.

Murray had been to the mountain before and had knowledge of the area, according to her sister. The bone fragments were described as "pretty small," and it was expected to take at least two months to determine if they were the remains of Murray or not. In November, it was announced that the remains were not of Murray.

In January 2022, FBI issued a national alert in Murray's case and created a Violent Criminal Apprehension Profile, allowing multiple law enforcement agencies to share information regarding her case.  In July 2022, law enforcement in New Hampshire initiated a search in the towns of Landaff and Easton.

Significance

Murray's disappearance has been cited as "the first crime mystery of the social media age", and generated speculation from the media and the public, specifically on the Internet, in online forums and message boards. Writing for Boston magazine in 2014, Bill Jensen noted: "Now, at least online, it often seems as there's no such thing as a cold case. But when Maura Murray disappeared, the social Web was in its infancy. There was no YouTube and no Twitter. On the day Maura went missing, Facebook was five days old. And so you can read the history of her case as a parable about the evolution of online sleuthing." In 2005, active discussion of Murray's disappearance was documented on websleuths.com, and in 2007, Facebook and Myspace pages were created dedicated to helping find her.

Media depictions 

In the years after Murray's disappearance, her case would receive media attention on CNN American Morning, The Montel Williams Show, 20/20, Nancy Grace’s Cold Case Files, ABC News, Disappeared, the Dr. Oz Show, NPRs StoryCorps, and NewsNation as well as in the Boston Globe, People Magazine, Newsweek, Seventeen Magazine, The New Yorker, Rolling Stone, and dozens of local and regional newspapers, magazines, radio and television programs. It also garnered significant speculation on Internet message boards and forums, with theories ranging from abduction to voluntary disappearance. In 2017, the case was the subject of a documentary series on the Oxygen network, which described Murray's disappearance as the "first crime mystery of the social media age", having occurred days after the launch of Facebook.

An episode of 20/20 compared Murray's case to that of Brooke Wilberger, who went missing in Oregon a few months after Murray's disappearance and was later found murdered. Murray was referenced on Disappeared, in the Season 1 (episode 6) 
In 2017, the Oxygen network produced a six-part television documentary miniseries titled The Disappearance of Maura Murray, hosted by Maggie Freleng, a journalist.

Maura's disappearance was the subject of the nonfiction thriller True Crime Addict: How I Lost Myself in the Mysterious Disappearance of Maura Murray by author and journalist James Renner. In the book, Renner proposed the theory that Murray traveled into New Hampshire with a tandem driver and may have disappeared willingly and started a new life elsewhere due to fears her pending credit card fraud case would prevent her being hired as a nurse, or less likely, was murdered by someone she knew. Murray's father, Fred, and immediate family have disputed this theory. Fred Murray stated that he believes his daughter was abducted and is dead.

See also
List of people who disappeared
Disappearance of Brianna Maitland, in a nearby area of Vermont a few weeks later; her car was also left behind after having crashed into a building.
Disappearance of Patricia Meehan, in Montana in 1989; she drove  from her home for unknown reasons and disappeared shortly after a car accident.

References

Further reading

External links
Maura Murray, Cold Case Unit, New Hampshire Department of Justice

Repository of information, James Renner's The Disappearance of Maura Murray blog

1982 births
2000s missing person cases
2004 in New Hampshire
Missing person cases in New Hampshire
February 2004 events in the United States
Haverhill, New Hampshire
Possibly living people